Suttungr , or Saturn XXIII, is a natural satellite of Saturn. It was discovered by Brett J. Gladman, et al. in 2000, and given the temporary designation S/2000 S 12. It was named for Suttungr in Norse mythology, a Jötunn or giant who once owned the mead of poetry.

Suttungr is about 7 kilometres in diameter, and orbits Saturn at an average distance of 19,667 Mm in 1029.703 days. It may have formed from debris knocked off Phoebe. The Suttung orbit is retrograde, at an inclination of 174° to the ecliptic (151° to Saturn's equator) and with an eccentricity of 0.131. Its rotation period is  hours, and like Albiorix its light curve exhibits two minima at certain angles, and three minima at others. Having a similar gray color and orbit as Thrymr, the two moons may be members of the same dynamical family.

Its name was announced in its oblique form Suttung in IAU Circular 8177. However, the IAU Working Group on Planetary System Nomenclature later decided to add the nominative suffix -r to the base form Suttung.

References

 IAUC 7548: S/2000 S 12 December 23, 2000 (discovery)
 MPEC 2000-Y33: S/2000 S 12 December 22, 2000 (recovery/discovery and ephemeris)
 IAUC 8177: Satellites of Jupiter, Saturn, Uranus August 8, 2003 (naming the moon Suttung)
 IAUC 8471: Satellites of Saturn January 21, 2005 (correcting the name)

Norse group
Moons of Saturn
Irregular satellites
Discoveries by Brett J. Gladman
Astronomical objects discovered in 2000
Moons with a retrograde orbit